The Diocese of Hamilton is a Latin Church ecclesiastical territory or diocese of the Catholic Church in Canada. It is a suffragan diocese in the ecclesiastical province of the metropolitan Archdiocese in Toronto.

The cathedral is the Cathedral Basilica of Christ the King, dedicated to Christ the King in 1933, in Hamilton, Ontario. There is a former cathedral, St. Mary’s Pro-Cathedral, also in Hamilton and a minor basilica, Our Lady Immaculate, in Guelph, Ontario.

History 
It was established on 29 February 1856 by Pope Pius IX as the Diocese of Hamilton, on territory split off from the Archdiocese of Toronto, which became its Metropolitan. On 22 November 1958, it lost territory to establish the Diocese of Saint Catharines. The Diocese of Hamilton celebrated its 150th anniversary in 2006, with Anthony Tonnos celebrating Mass at the seat of the diocese. Special signs, marks and posters were commissioned for many of the diocese's churches, schools and buildings.

Bishops

Episcopal ordinaries
 John Farrell (1856.02.29 – death 28 September 1873), a native of Ireland, consecrated May 11, 1856. He introduced Catholic schools, built St. Mary's Cathedral, and helped to establish the academies of the Ladies of Loretto in Hamilton and Guelph. He also encouraged the founding of St. Jerome's College by the Fathers of the Resurrection, and confided the Owen Sound Missions to the Basilian Fathers. The CRC had been formed in 1836 in Paris. Many of its members were Polish emigres who left their native country in a time of political turmoil.
 P. F. Crinnon (1874.02.03 – death November 25, 1882), also born in Ireland and consecrated April 19, 1873. He built St. Patrick's Church in Hamilton, Ontario, established the House of Providence, Dundas and secured a site for Holy Sepulchre Cemetery.
 James Joseph Carbery (1883.09.04 – death 17 December 1887 in Ireland), Dominican Order (O.P.) also born in Ireland, consecrated on November 11, 1883, and held an important diocesan synod.
 T. J. Dowling, D.D., first Canadian incumbent (1889.01.11 – death 1924.08.06), previously Bishop of Peterborough (Canada) (1886.12.14 – 1889.01.11). Since his May 1889 installment, 14 new parishes had been established, 28 priests ordained, and 22 new churches, schools and presbyteries erected. Catholic hospitals at Hamilton and Guelph, and the new House of Providence at Dundas were also established in his time. During Dowling's time, there were 42 priests in the diocese of Canadian by birth. Four were from Ireland, four from the United States, four from France, three from Germany, two from Poland and two from Italy. Candidates for the priesthood studied at St. Jerome's College in Berlin, Ontario (now called Kitchener, Ontario) and Grand Seminary in Montreal, Quebec. The diocese had nine parishes for German-speaking people and one Indian parish. There were also chapels for Poles and Italians.
 John T. McNally (1924.08.12 – 1937.02.17), previously Bishop of Calgary (Canada) (1913.04.04 – 1924.08.12); later Metropolitan Archbishop of Halifax (Canada) (1937.02.17 – 1952.11.18). 
 Joseph F. Ryan (1937.08.16 – retired 1973.03.27), died 1990. His term brought much growth and expansion of churches and Catholic schools. 
 Paul F. Reding (1973.09.14 – death 1983.12.08) succeeding as previous Auxiliary Bishop of Hamilton (1966.07.02 – 1973.09.14) and Titular Bishop of Liberalia (1966.07.02 – 1973.09.14)
Auxiliary Bishop (1978.02.09 – 1982.08.12) James Hector MacDonald, Titular Bishop of Gibba (1978.02.09 – 1982.08.12); next Bishop of Charlottetown (Canada) (1982.08.12 – 1991.02.02), Metropolitan Archbishop of Saint John’s (Newfoundland, Canada) (1991.02.02 – retired 2000.12.04)
 Anthony F. Tonnos (1984.05.02 – retired on November 8, 2010 after 27 years in the diocese, informally remaining active), succeeding as previous Auxiliary Bishop of Hamilton (1983.05.13 – 1984.05.02) and Titular Bishop of Nationa (1983.05.13 – 1984.05.02)
Auxiliary Bishop Matthew Francis Ustrzycki (1985.05.10 – retired 2007.06.01, still informally active in the diocese), Titular Bishop of Nationa (1985.05.10 – ...)
 Auxiliary bishop Gerard (Paul) Bergie (2005.07.11 – 2010.09.14), Titular Bishop of Tabæ (2005.07.11 – 2010.09.14); next Bishop of Saint Catharines (Ontario, Canada) (2010.09.14 – ...)
 Douglas Crosby (November 8, 2010 – present), also Vice-President of Canadian Conference of Catholic Bishops (2013.09.25 – 2015.09.15), President of Canadian Conference of Catholic Bishops (2015.09.15 – ...); previously Bishop of the Bishop of Labrador City–Schefferville (Canada) (1997.10.24 – 2007.05.31), Bishop of Saint George’s (Canada) (2003.08.06 – 2007.05.31), Bishop of Corner Brook and Labrador (Newfoundland and Labrador, Canada) (2007.05.31 – 2010.09.24)
Auxiliary bishop Daniel Joseph Miehm (2013.02.20 – 2017.03.10), Titular Bishop of Gor (2013.02.20 – 2017.03.10); next Bishop of Peterborough (Canada) (2017.03.10 – ...).

Auxiliary bishops
 Paul Francis Reding (1966-1973), appointed Bishop here
 James Hector MacDonald (1978-1982), appointed Bishop of Charlottetown, Prince Edward Island
 Anthony Frederick Tonnos (1982-1983), appointed Bishop here
 Matthew Francis Ustrzycki (1985-2017)
 Gerard Paul Bergie (2005-2010), appointed Bishop of Saint Catharines, Ontario
 Daniel Joseph Miehm (2013-2017), appointed Bishop of Peterborough, Ontario
 Wayne Lawrence Lobsinger (2020–present), appointed Bishop of Gemellae in Numidia

Other priests of this diocese who became bishops
 Joseph Anthony O'Sullivan, appointed Bishop of Charlottetown, Prince Edward Island in 1931
 Joseph Lawrence Wilhelm, appointed Auxiliary Bishop of Calgary, Alberta in 1963
 John Michael Sherlock, appointed Auxiliary Bishop of London, Ontario in 1974
 Thomas Christopher Collins, appointed Coadjutor Bishop of Saint Paul in Alberta in 1997; future Cardinal
 Peter Joseph Hundt, appointed Auxiliary Bishop of Toronto, Ontario in 2006

Statistics and extent 
, it pastorally served 626,723 Catholics (28.5% of 2,201,155 total) on 16,824 km2 in 124 parishes and 1 mission with 228 priests (137 diocesan, 91 religious), 35 deacons, 269 lay religious (102 brothers, 167 sisters) and 15 seminarians.

The Diocese of Hamilton comprises the counties and regions of Brant, Bruce, Grey, Halton, Hamilton, Waterloo, Wellington, as well as four Townships in the County of Dufferin, all located in Ontario. The Diocese of Hamilton had begun as a Catholic Mission in Upper Canada (Ontario).
There are 6 deaneries (Brant, Bruce-Grey, Halton, Hamilton, Waterloo and Wellington) which have 126 parishes in their geographical grouping. There are 7 Catholic school boards in the diocese, 1 Catholic university and 3 university Catholic campus ministries. It has 142 secular and 98 religious priests ministering to 620,518 people in 126 parishes.

Catholic schools 
The Government of Ontario accords Catholic schools the same rights as public schools. The taxes paid by Catholics go to support Catholic schools only. Teachers, whether religious or lay, must be qualified to teach according to the same regulations as those governing public school teachers.

Here are the institutions, within the jurisdiction of the Diocese:

 Conseil scolaire catholique MonAvenir
 Hamilton-Wentworth Catholic District School Board
 Halton Catholic District School Board
 Brant Haldimand Norfolk Catholic District School Board
 Wellington Catholic District School Board
 Waterloo Catholic District School Board
 Bruce-Grey Catholic District School Board

Cemeteries 
 Holy Sepulchre Catholic Cemetery (Burlington West-Hamilton Centre)
 Gates of Heaven Catholic Cemetery (Burlington West-Hamilton Centre)
 Our Lady of Angels Catholic Cemetery (Hamilton East-Stoney Creek)
 Resurrection Catholic Cemetery (Hamilton West-Ancaster-Dundas)
 Marymount Catholic Cemetery (Waterloo-Guelph-Wellington)
 Holy Cross Catholic Cemetery (Cambridge-Brantford-Brant)
 Holy Redeemer Catholic Cemetery (Erin-Halton Hills)
 Holy Family Catholic Cemetery (Burlington East-Milton-Oakville)

Gallery

See also 
 List of Catholic dioceses in Canada
 Roman Catholic Archdiocese of Toronto

References

Sources and external links 
 Diocese of Hamilton website
 GCatholic, with Google map and satellite photo data for most sections
 Catholic Hierarchy -  Diocese of Hamilton
 
 Detailed Short History 
 Holy Sepulchre Cemetery

 
1856 establishments in Ontario
1856 establishments in Canada